Max Peter Coates (born 4 January 1994) is a British racing driver currently competing in the 2022 Mini Challenge UK. He is a former Clio Cup UK competitor but has since moved factors as the Clio Cup withdrew from being a British Touring Car Championship support race.

Racing career
After several years of karting, Coates made his car racing debut in 2010, racing in the Ginetta Junior Championship.  He spent two years in this series before graduating to the Ginetta GT Supercup for 2012, 2013 and 2014, but his racing programmes have often been stymied by a lack of budget, restricting him to part-seasons and guest appearances, such as a one-off outing in the Porsche Carrera Cup Great Britain in 2014.

After four rounds of the 2015 British Touring Car Championship season, Coates was signed by the Support Our Paras team to drive its second entry for the remainder of the season, alongside Derek Palmer Jr. He took the seat that was previously occupied by Richard Hawken and Martin Donnelly. However, due a sponsorship problem, he lost his drive following just one round of the championship.

After a successful season in 2018, Coates once again joined Guy Colclough in the DAT Racing TCR-spec SEAT to race in the 2019 Britcar Endurance Championship season.

Racing record

Complete Ginetta Junior Championship results
(key) (Races in bold indicate pole position – 1 point awarded just in first race; races in italics indicate fastest lap – 1 point awarded all races;-

Complete Ginetta GT4 Supercup results
(key) (Races in bold indicate pole position – 1 point awarded just in first race; races in italics indicate fastest lap – 1 point awarded all races;-

Complete British Touring Car Championship results
(key) (Races in bold indicate pole position – 1 point awarded just in first race; races in italics indicate fastest lap – 1 point awarded all races; * signifies that driver led race for at least one lap – 1 point given all races)

Complete Renault Clio Cup UK results
(key) (Races in bold indicate pole position – 1 point awarded just in first race; races in italics indicate fastest lap – 1 point awarded all races;- Races with * indicate driver lead a lap in race – 1 point awarded all races (2018-2019);-

{| class="wikitable" style="text-align:center; font-size:85%"
! Year
! Team
! 1
! 2
! 3
! 4
! 5
! 6
! 7
! 8
! 9
! 10
! 11
! 12
! 13
! 14
! 15
! 16
! 17
! 18
! DC
! Pts
|-
| 2016
! Ciceley Motorsport
|style="background:#DFFFDF;"| BHI16
|style="background:#DFFFDF;"| BHI28
|style="background:#DFFFDF;"| DON14
|style="background:#DFFFDF;"| DON25
|style="background:#DFFFDF;"| THR19
|style="background:#DFFFDF;"| THR210
|style="background:#FFDF9F;"| OUL13
|style="background:#DFFFDF;"| OUL25
|style="background:#DFDFDF;"| CRO12
|style="background:#FFFFBF;"| CRO21
|style="background:#DFDFDF;"| SNE12
|style="background:#DFFFDF;"| SNE25
|style="background:#DFFFDF;"| ROC18
|style="background:#FFDF9F;"| ROC23
|style="background:#DFFFDF;"| SIL15
|style="background:#FFDF9F;"| SIL25
|style="background:#DFFFDF;"| BHGP16
|style="background:#DFDFDF;"| BHGP22
! style="background:#FFDF9F;"| 3rd
! style="background:#FFDF9F;"| 361
|-
| 2017
! Ciceley Motorsport
|style="background:#DFFFDF;"| BHI16
|style="background:#DFFFDF;"| BHI26
|style="background:#FFFFBF;"| DON11
|style="background:#FFDF9F;"| DON23
|style="background:#DFFFDF;"| THR18
|style="background:#EFCFFF;"| THR2Ret<
|style="background:#DFFFDF;"| OUL16
|style="background:#DFFFDF;"| OUL25
|style="background:#DFFFDF;"| CRO16
|style="background:#DFDFDF;"| CRO22
|style="background:#DFFFDF;"| SNE17
|style="background:#DFDFDF;"| SNE22
|style="background:#FFFFBF;"| ROC11
|style="background:#FFDF9F;"| ROC23
|style="background:#DFFFDF;"| SIL19
|style="background:#DFFFDF;"| SIL24
|style="background:#DFFFDF;"| BHGP18
|style="background:#DFFFDF;"| BHGP29
! 4th
! 360
|-
| 2018
! Team Pyro
|style="background:#DFFFDF;"| BHI15*
|style="background:#FFFFBF;"| BHI21*
|style="background:#DFFFDF;"| DON16
|style="background:#DFFFDF;"| DON26
|style="background:#DFDFDF;"| THR12*
|style="background:#FFDF9F;"| THR23
|style="background:#FFDF9F;"| OUL13
|style="background:#FFFFBF;"| OUL21*
|style="background:#DFDFDF;"| CRO12
|style="background:#FFFFBF;"| CRO21*
|style="background:#DFFFDF;"| SNE111
|style="background:#FFFFBF;"| SNE21*
|style="background:#EFCFFF;"| ROC1Ret
|style="background:#FFDF9F;"| ROC23
|style="background:#EFCFFF;"| SIL1Ret
|style="background:#DFFFDF;"| SIL25
|style="background:#DFFFDF;"| BHGP15
|style="background:#DFFFDF;"| BHGP24
! style="background:#FFDF9F;"| 3rd
! style="background:#FFDF9F;"| 309
|-
| 2019
! Team HARD
|style="background:#FFFFBF;"| BHI11*
|style="background:#FFFFBF;"| BHI21*
|style="background:#EFCFFF;"| DON1Ret
|style="background:#FFDF9F;"| DON23
|style="background:#FFFFBF;"| CRO11*
|style="background:#FFFFBF;"| CRO21*
|style="background:#FFDF9F;"| OUL13
|style="background:#FFFFBF;"| OUL21*
|style="background:#DFFFDF;"| SNE16*
|style="background:#FFFFBF;"| SNE21
|style="background:#DFDFDF;"| THR12
|style="background:#EFCFFF;"| THR2Ret*
|style="background:#FFFFBF;"| KNO11*
|style="background:#DFDFDF;"| KNO22
|style="background:#DFDFDF;"| SIL12
|style="background:#DFFFDF;"| SIL211
|style="background:#FFDF9F;"| BRH13
|style="background:#DFDFDF;"| BRH22
! style="background:#DFDFDF;"| 2nd
! style="background:#DFDFDF;"| 357
|}

Complete Britcar results
(key) (Races in bold indicate pole position in class – 1 point awarded just in first race; races in italics indicate fastest lap in class – 1 point awarded all races;-

Complete TCR UK/Touring Car Trophy results
(key) (Races in bold''' indicate pole position – 1 point awarded just in first race; races in italics'' indicate fastest lap – 1 point awarded all races; * signifies that driver led race for at least one lap – 1 point given all races)

References

External links
 Official website
 

Living people
British Touring Car Championship drivers
English racing drivers
British racing drivers
Britcar drivers
24H Series drivers
1994 births
Renault UK Clio Cup drivers
Ginetta GT4 Supercup drivers
Ginetta Junior Championship drivers
Mini Challenge UK drivers